Majuli University of Culture is a public state university located in Majuli, Assam dedicated for research, teaching and education in the field of culture. The university is established by Majuli University of Culture Bill, 2017 which was passed by the Government of Assam on 7 September 2017. On 13 July 2018 Chief Minister Sarbananda Sonowal laid the foundation stone for the state's first cultural university at Majuli to be built at an estimated cost of Rs 300 crore.

On 21 September 2022 Professor Nirode Boruah took oath as the Vice Chancellor of the Majuli University of Culture at a function held in Raj Bhavan.

References 

Universities in Assam
2019 establishments in Assam
Educational institutions established in 2019
State universities in India
2019 establishments